Braun-Whalum-Brown, better known as BWB, is a jazz band that is named after its three members:  guitarist Norman Brown, saxophonist Kirk Whalum, and trumpeter Rick Braun.

Discography

Albums 
 Groovin'  (2002, Warner Bros. Records/WEA)
 Human Nature: The Songs of Michael Jackson (2013, Heads Up International/Concord Music Group)
 BWB (2016, Artistry Music/Mack Avenue Records)

Session 
 "Hoddamile (Hot Or Mild)" from Into My Soul, Kirk Whalum (2003, Warner Bros. Records/WEA)
 "Can We Talk" from Kirk Whalum Performs the Babyface Songbook, Kirk Whalum (2005, Rendezvous Entertainment)
 "It Ain't Over BWB" from Stay with Me, Norman Brown (2007, Peak Records/Concord Music Group)

References

External links 
Norman Brown
Kirk Whalum
Rick Braun
BWB

American jazz ensembles
Jazz fusion ensembles
Smooth jazz ensembles